The Vienna Rectifier is a pulse-width modulation rectifier, invented in 1993 by Johann W. Kolar.

Features

Vienna Rectifier provides following features:
 Three-phase three-level three-switch PWM rectifier with controlled output voltage.
 Three-wire input, no connection to neutral.
 Ohmic mains behaviour 
 Boost system (continuous input current).
 Unidirectional power flow.
 High power density.
 Low conducted common-mode electro-magnetic interference (EMI) emissions.
 Simple control to stabilize the neutral point potential.
 Low complexity, low realization effort 
 Low .
 Reliable behaviour (guaranteeing ohmic mains behaviour) under heavily unbalanced mains voltages and in case of mains failure.

Topology
The Vienna Rectifier is a unidirectional three-phase three-switch three-level Pulse-width modulation (PWM) rectifier.  It can be seen as a three-phase diode bridge with an integrated boost converter.

Applications

The Vienna Rectifier is useful wherever six-switch converters are used for achieving sinusoidal mains current and controlled output voltage, when no energy feedback from the load into the mains is available.  In practice, use of the Vienna Rectifier is advantageous when space is at a sufficient premium to justify the additional hardware cost.  These include:
 Telecommunications power supplies.
 Uninterruptable power supplies.
 Input stages of AC-drive converter systems.
Figure 2 shows the top and bottom views of an air-cooled 10 kW-Vienna Rectifier (400 kHz PWM), with sinusoidal input current s and controlled output voltage.  Dimensions are 250mm x 120mm x 40mm, resulting in a power density of 8.5 kW/dm3.  The total weight of the converter is 2.1 kg

Current and voltage waveforms

Figure 3 shows the system behavior, calculated using the power-electronics circuit simulator. Between the output voltage midpoint (0) and the mains midpoint (M) the common mode voltage u0M appears, as is characteristic in three-phase converter systems.

Current control and balance of the neutral point at the DC-side
It is possible to separately control the input current shape in each branch of the diode bridge by inserting a bidirectional switch into the node, as shown in Figure 3.  The switch Ta controls the current by controlling the magnetization of the inductor.   Switched on charges the inductor which drives the current through the bidirectional switch.  Deactivating the switch increases causes the current to bypass the switch and flow through the freewheeling diodes Da+ and Da-.  This results in a negative voltage across the inductor and drains it.  This demonstrates the ability of the topology to control the current in phase with the mains voltage (Power-factor correction capability).

To generate a sinusoidal power input which is in phase with the voltage

the average voltage space vector over a pulse-period must satisfy:

For high switching frequencies or low inductivities we require .
The available voltage space vectors required for the input voltage are defined by the switching states  and the direction of the phase currents. Fig. 4 shows the conduction states of the system, and from this we get the input space vectors shows in Fig. 5

References

Electronic circuits
Electric power conversion
Power electronics
Rectifiers